The Waco CG-15 was an American military glider, which was developed from the CG-4. Although outwardly similar to its predecessor and carrying the same number of passengers, a number of changes in the design, including shortened wings and a more streamlined nose enabled it to travel faster. 1,000 were ordered and 473 were delivered before production ceased. Two were transferred to the Navy for testing as the XLR2W-1. One unit was converted into an XPG-3 powered glider which used two Jacobs R-755-9 radial engines.

Variants
XCG-15Prototype converted from a CG-4A, one conversion.
XCG-15ANew-build prototypes, two built.
CG-15AProduction variant, redesignated G-15A in 1948, 427 built.
PG-3One XCG-15A fitted with two R-755-9 engines, redesignated G-3A in 1948.
XLR2W-1Two CG-15As transferred to the United States Navy.
G-3APG-3 redesignated in 1948.
G-15ACG-15A redesignated in 1948.

Operators

 United States Army Air Force
 United States Navy

Specifications (CG-15A)

See also

References

1940s United States military transport aircraft
World War II aircraft of the United States
1940s United States military gliders
CG-15